Marietta Blau (29 April 1894 – 27 January 1970) was an Austrian physicist credited with developing photographic nuclear emulsions that were usefully able to image and accurately measure high-energy nuclear particles and events, significantly advancing the field of particle physics in her time. For this, she was awarded the Lieben Prize by the Austrian Academy of Sciences. As a Jew, she was forced to flee Austria when Nazi Germany annexed it in 1938, eventually making her way to the United States. She was nominated for Nobel Prizes in both physics and chemistry for her work, but did not win. After her return to Austria, she won the Erwin Schrödinger Prize from the Austrian Academy of Sciences.

Biography

Blau was born on 29 April 1894 in a middle-class Jewish family, to Mayer (Markus) Blau, a court lawyer and music publisher, and his wife, Florentine Goldzweig. After having obtained the general certificate of education from the girls' high school run by the Association for the Extended Education of Women, she studied physics and mathematics at the University of Vienna from 1914 to 1918; her PhD, on the absorption of gamma rays, was awarded in March 1919. Blau is credited with developing (photographic) nuclear emulsions that were usefully able to image and accurately measure high energy nuclear particles and events. Additionally, this established a method to accurately study reactions caused by cosmic ray events. Her nuclear emulsions significantly advanced the field of particle physics in her time. For her work, she was nominated several times, during the period 1950 to 1957, for the Nobel Prize in Physics and once for the  Nobel Prize in Chemistry by Erwin Schrödinger and Hans Thirring.

Pre World War 2 

From 1919 to 1923, Blau held several positions in industrial and University research institutions in Austria and Germany; in 1921, she moved to Berlin to work at a manufacturer of x-ray tubes, a position she left in order to become an assistant at the Institute for Medical Physics at the University of Frankfurt am Main.  From 1923 on, she worked as an unpaid scientist at the Institute for Radium Research of the Austrian Academy of Sciences in Vienna. A stipend by the Austrian Association of University Women made it possible for her to do research also in Göttingen and Paris (1932/1933).

In her Vienna years, Blau's main interest was the development of the photographic method of particle detection. The methodical goals which she pursued were the identification of particles, in particular alpha-particles and protons, and the determination of their energy based on the characteristics of the tracks they left in emulsions; there, she developed a photographic emulsion technique used in the study of cosmic rays, being the first scientist to use nuclear emulsions to detect neutrons. For this work, Blau and her former student Hertha Wambacher received the Lieben Prize of the Austrian Academy of Sciences in 1937. It was her greatest success when, also in 1937, she and Wambacher discovered "disintegration stars" in photographic plates that had been exposed to cosmic radiation at an altitude of 2,300 metres (≈7,500 feet) above sea level. These stars are the patterns of particle tracks from nuclear reactions (spallation events) of cosmic-ray particles with nuclei of the photographic emulsion.

Because of her Jewish descent, Blau had to leave Austria in 1938 after the country's annexation by Nazi Germany, a fact which caused a severe break in her scientific career. She first went to Oslo. Then, through the intercession of Albert Einstein, she obtained a teaching position at the Instituto Politécnico Nacional in Mexico City and later at Universidad Michoacana de San Nicolás de Hidalgo, but since conditions in Mexico made research extremely difficult for her, she seized an opportunity to move to the United States in 1944.

Post-war 
In the United States, Blau worked in industry until 1948, afterwards (until 1960) at Columbia University, Brookhaven National Laboratory and the University of Miami. At these institutions, she was responsible for the application of the photographic method of particle detection in high-energy experiments at particle accelerators.

In 1960, Blau returned to Austria and conducted scientific work at the Institute for Radium Research until 1964 – again without pay. She headed a working group analyzing particle-track photographs from experiments at CERN and supervised a dissertation in this field. In 1962, she received the Erwin Schrödinger Prize of the Austrian Academy of Sciences, but an attempt to make her also a corresponding member of the Academy was not successful.

Death 
Marietta Blau died in Vienna from cancer on 27 January 1970. Her illness was related to her unprotected handling of radioactive substances as well as her cigarette smoking over many years. No obituary appeared in any scientific publication.

Legacy 
In 1950, Cecil Powell received the Nobel Prize in Physics for the development of the photographic method for particle detection and the discovery of the pion by use of Blau's method.

See also 
 Timeline of women in science
 The Matilda effect

References

Literature
 Robert Rosner & Brigitte Strohmaier (eds.) (2003) Marietta Blau – Sterne der Zertrümmerung. Biographie einer Wegbereiterin der modernen Teilchenphysik. Böhlau, Vienna  (in German)
 Brigitte Strohmaier & Robert Rosner (2006) Marietta Blau – Stars of Disintegration. Biography of a pioneer of particle physics. Ariadne, Riverside, California 
 
 Leopold Halpern & Maurice Shapiro (2006) "Marietta Blau" in Out of the Shadows: Contributions of Twentieth-Century Women to Physics, Nina Byers and Gary Williams, ed., Cambridge University Press .

External links
 
 "Marietta Blau" in CWP at UCLA
Rentetzi, Maria "Marietta Blau", Jewish Women: A Comprehensive Historical Encyclopedia
 Sime, Ruth Lewin, "Marietta Blau: Pioneer of Photographic Nuclear Emulsions and Particle Physics", Physics in Perspective, 15 (2013) 3–32

20th-century Austrian physicists
Austrian nuclear physicists
1894 births
1970 deaths
Austrian women physicists
20th-century Austrian women scientists
Schrödinger Prize recipients
Jewish emigrants from Austria to the United States after the Anschluss
Scientists from Vienna
Deaths from cancer in Austria
University of Vienna alumni
Particle physicists
Brookhaven National Laboratory staff
Nuclear physicists
Women nuclear physicists
Academic staff of the Instituto Politécnico Nacional
Academic staff of Universidad Michoacana de San Nicolás de Hidalgo
People associated with CERN
American women academics